Bauschke is a surname. Notable people with the surname include:

Karin Bauschke, German rower and coxswain who won four medals at European championships of 1966–1970
Melanie Bauschke (born 1988), German long-jump athlete